Łąki Markowe is a village in the administrative district of Gmina Boniewo, within Włocławek County, Kuyavian-Pomeranian Voivodeship, in north-central Poland. It has approximately 100 inhabitants. It is the birthplace of Polish sportsmen Zygmunt Jałoszyński and Roman Jałoszyński.

References

Villages in Włocławek County